Jacques Moderne - Giacomo Moderno (Pinguente, Istria [now Buzet, Croatia], c.1495–1500 – Lyons, after 1560) was an Italian-born music publisher active in France in the Renaissance Era.

Moderne was the second printer to publish music on a large scale in France using the single-impression method. The first one was Pierre Attaingnant (c. 1494–1551/2) of Paris, who began issuing his music books in 1527/8.

Although Moderne is nowadays known as a music publisher, which was a major part of his production and the part that brought him the greatest renown, he printed about one hundred books of several themes, such as religion, home remedies, palmistry, among others.

References
Laurent Guillo. Les éditions musicales de la Renaissance lyonnaise. Paris : Klincksieck, 1991.
Daniel Heartz, Pierre Attaingnant, royal printer of music : a historical study and bibliography catalogue, Berkeley, University of California Press, 1969.
Guy Parguez. Un unicum de Jacques Moderne, père de l'édition musicale lyonnaise. In Gryphe : revue de la Bibliothèque de Lyon 1 (2000), p. 11-13.
Samuel Francis Pogue. Jacques Moderne, Lyons music printer of the sixteenth century. - Genève : Droz, 1969. (Travaux d'Humanisme et Renaissance, 101).
Samuel Francis Pogue. Further notes on Jacques Moderne. In Bibliothèque d'Humanisme et Renaissance 35 (1975), p. 245-250. [Addenda sans rapport avec les éditions musicales]
Samuel Francis Pogue. A sixteenth-century editor at work : Gardane and Moderne. In Journal of Musicology 1 (1982), p. 217-238.
 Dobbins, Frank; Pogue, Samuel. Jacques Moderne, in The New Grove Dictionary of Music and Musicians Online, ed. L. Macy (Accessed March 7, 2010), (subscription access) 
 Radole, G. Giacomo Moderno da Pinguente, Voce Giuliana, I.X. 1980

External links

French music publishers (people)
People from Istria
1490s births
16th-century deaths